In Dutch politics the bordes scene (Dutch:bordesscène) is the official presentation of a new cabinet with the monarch on the "bordes" (wide stairs) of the royal palace.

During the bordes scene the prime minister and the senior vice prime minister (usually from the second largest party in the cabinet) stand respectively on the right and the left of the monarch with the remaining ministers and state secretaries standing around them. The women are generally not placed next to each other.

The bordes scene is intended to give the media an occasion to make photos and videos of the new cabinet. The tradition was started in 1971 when the cabinet first Biesheuvel cabinet presented itself with Queen Juliana at Huis ten Bosch and later at her home, Palace Soestdijk (with the exception of the second Van Agt cabinet, which presented itself in the hall of Huis ten Bosch).

During the reign of her daughter Queen Beatrix the bordes scene took place at her home residence Huis ten Bosch, except for the bordes scene of the second Kok cabinet in 1998, which, due to ongoing maintenance, took place on the stairs at the back of Noordeinde Palace, which is the Dutch monarch's working palace. For the same reason, the first bordes scene of King Willem-Alexander (in 2017) took place at Noordeinde Palace. Due to the larger number of ministers, the limited space on the stairs of Huis ten Bosch and the ongoing COVID pandemic, the bordes scene for the incoming Rutte IV cabinet is scheduled to take place at Noordeinde Palace on 10 January 2022.

Rump cabinets such as the third Van Agt cabinet and the third Balkenende cabinet are not presented with a bordes scene.

References

Dutch political institutions